Pure Attraction is the fourth full-length album by singer-songwriter Kathy Troccoli and her first since her 1986 album Images. It was released on October 29, 1991, on Reunion Records. It saw her moving slowly away from Christian music and into mainstream pop territory, with two songs written by Diane Warren. It featured the top five CCM and top twenty pop hit "Everything Changes", and featured seven songs co-written by Troccoli. The album peaked at number 9 on the Billboard Top Christian Albums chart.

Track listing
"Everything Changes" (Diane Warren) - 4:25
"Can't Get You Out My Heart" (Warren) - 4:24
"You've Got a Way" (Troccoli, Jeff Frenzel) - 3:55
"Only Love Can Know" (Troccoli, Ric Wake, Rich Tancredi) - 5:14
"Help Myself to You" (Troccoli) - 4:14
"The Hard Days" (Troccoli, Bill Montvilo) - 4:06
"Love Was Never Meant to Die" (Troccoli, Frenzel) - 4:47
"You and I" (Stevie Wonder) - 3:16
"Love Has Found Me Here" (David Ray, Troccoli, Montvilo) - 4:40
"You're Still Here" (Troccoli, Jack Fowler) - 4:01

Critical reception

Brian Mansfield of AllMusic gave Pure Attraction 4 1/2 out of 5 stars saying "Troccoli's first recording after a five-year absence was her most commercial, with the Diane Warren-penned 'Everything Changes' hitting Top Five on CHR radio. Troccoli had developed her songwriting during her time away; she wrote seven of Pure Attraction's cuts, emphasizing the torch-song style she loves."

Over at Cross Rhythms, Jonathan Priday has a different opinion about the album. He said that Pure Attraction "is one of those albums where the choice of producer has determined the entire character of the piece. Ric Wake, best known for his work with Mariah Carey and Taylor Dayne, has ensured that it's the vocals that are the centre of attention. The result is an imbalance in the tracks which leans too heavily on soulful ballads like 'Love Was Never Meant To Die' and 'You're Still Here.' The quality of her voice is not in question - it has a richness that makes a pleasant change from the 'little girl' vocals we get plagued with."

Production
 Produced by Ric Wake For Wake Productions
 Executive Producers – Michael Blanton and Terry Hemmings
 A&R – Cindy Dupree
 Recorded and Mixed by Bob Cadway
 Assistant Engineers – Dan Hetzel and Thomas R. Yezzi
 Mastered by Stephen Marcussen at Precision Mastering (Hollywood, CA).
 Coordinator – David Barratt
 Art Direction – D.L. Rhodes
 Design – Buddy Jackson
 Photography – Diego Uchitel

Personnel
 Kathy Troccoli – lead and backing vocals
 Rich Tancredi – keyboards, arrangements 
 Bob Cadway – guitars
 Al Pitrelli – guitars
 Mark Russell – bass
 Joey Franco – drums
 Jim Hobson – drum and percussion programming
 Richie Cannata – saxophone 
 Ric Wake – arrangements
 Mary Davis – backing vocals 
 Tony Harnell – backing vocals
 Billy T. Scott – backing vocals
 Tina Stanford – backing vocals
 Joe Lynn Turner – backing vocals
 Brenda White-King – backing vocals

Remixes
The song "Everything Changes" was remixed (by Ric Wake, Larry Robinson & Richie Jones) and re-released as a 12" single in 1992. The track listing is as follows:

Everything Changes (Extended Hot Mix)
Everything Changes (Wake Up The House Mix)
Everything Changes (The Underground Dub Mix)
Everything Changes (The Underground Mix)
Everything Changes (The Underground House Mix)
The Hard Days (LP Version)

Charts

Radio singles

References 

1991 albums
Albums produced by Ric Wake
Kathy Troccoli albums
Reunion Records albums
Geffen Records albums